Wrights is a brand of trim and other textiles for home sewing. It, and its subsidiary Lending Textile, operates using Wright, EZ Quilting, Boye and Bondex as brands. Since November 2017, it has been part of CSS Industries.

Wrights was founded in Massachusetts in 1897 as William E. Wright & Sons. Wright & Sons remained independent until 1985, when a group of shareholders—including a grandson of the founder—enabled the Newell Company to acquire a minority share in the company; by the end of the year Newell had achieved majority control and, by 1987, total ownership. In 1989 Boye Needle Company was merged into Wrights. In 2000 Conso International, a South Carolina manufacturer of trims to the wholesale trade and owners of the Simplicity Pattern brand, bought the company. Conso changed its name to Simplicity Creative Group and was acquired by Wilton Brands LLC and, in November 2017, by CSS Industries.

References

External links
 Official website (archived)

Textile companies of the United States
Manufacturing companies based in Massachusetts
Companies based in Worcester County, Massachusetts
Manufacturing companies established in 1897
1897 establishments in Massachusetts
Manufacturing companies disestablished in 2000
2000 disestablishments in Massachusetts